Yamyady (Yamyaźı) is a rural locality (a village) in Orlovsky Selsoviet, Yanaulsky District, Bashkortostan, Russia. The population was 43 as of 2010. There is 1 street.

Geography 
Yamyady is located 29 km southeast of Yanaul (the district's administrative centre) by road. Orlovka is the nearest rural locality.

References 

Rural localities in Yanaulsky District